Steichen is a surname. Notable people with the surname include:

 Donna Steichen, American journalist
 Edward Steichen, Luxembourgian-American photographer and artist
 Mary Calderone (1904–1998), American physician and a public health advocate; daughter of Edward
 Félicien M. Steichen, American surgeon
 
 
 Gerald Steichen (born 1963), American conductor, pianist, and stage actor
 
 Jules Steichen (1902–1977), Luxembourgian boxer
 
 Marie Steichen
 René Steichen (born 1942), Luxembourgian politician and jurist

See also
 Stade Demy Steichen, a football stadium in Steinfort, Luxembourg
 Steichen (crater), a crater on Mercury

German-language surnames
Surnames of Luxembourgian origin